Puppet Master III: Toulon's Revenge is a 1991 direct-to-video horror film written by Charles Band, C. Courtney Joyner and David Schmoeller, and directed by David DeCoteau. It is the third film in the Puppet Master franchise, a prequel to 1989's Puppet Master and 1990's Puppet Master II, and stars Guy Rolfe as a puppeteer whose ability to animate lifeless material attracts the attention of the Nazis, whose members are played by Richard Lynch, Ian Abercrombie, and Walter Gotell.

Toulon's Revenge, as well as the second, fourth, and fifth installments of the series, were only available in DVD format through a Full Moon Features box set that has since been discontinued.  However, in 2007, Full Moon Features reacquired the rights to the first five films, and the box set has since been reissued and is available directly from Full Moon, as well as through several online retailers.

The film is also available on DVD along with the first two films on a triple feature "Midnight Horror Collection" at a budget price. A remastered edition Blu-ray and DVD of the film was released on September 18, 2012.

Plot

The film is set during 1941 in World War II Berlin. A scientist named Dr. Hess is forced by the Nazis, especially his Gestapo liaison Major Kraus, to create a drug capable of animating corpses to use as living shields on the battlefield after losing too many on the Eastern Front. But, Dr. Hess cannot get it right: While the corpses do reanimate, they have a tendency towards mindless violence. In a small theater downtown, André Toulon has set up a politically satirical puppet show for children, starring a six-armed American Old West puppet named Six-Shooter, who attacks an inanimate reconstruction puppet of Adolf Hitler. The show is, next to a crowd of children, also attended by Lt. Erich Stein, Kraus' driver. After the performance, Toulon and his wife Elsa feed the puppets with the formula which sustains their life force, but they are watched by Stein, who informs his superior the next morning. Hess, genuinely fascinated by the formula, wants Toulon to freely share the secret with him, but Kraus wants to take Toulon in for treason and insulting of the Führer.

The next day, André gives Elsa a puppet crafted in her likeness as a gift, but soon afterwards Kraus, Hess, and a squad of soldiers break into the atelier and take Toulon, Tunneler, and Pinhead. When Elsa attempts to prevent them from taking the formula as well, she is shot by one of the escort, and Toulon is dragged away from her. When Kraus prepares to leave, the wounded Elsa spits at him in defiance, and in retaliation, Kraus shoots her dead in cold blood. However, while transporting Toulon off, the two soldiers guarding him are killed by Pinhead and Tunneler, enabling Toulon to escape.

After hiding for the remainder of the night, Toulon returns to his theater to find that the stage has been burnt by the Nazis. He finds Six-Shooter and Jester and leaves with them, then discovers a partially destroyed hospital and decides to set up camp in it. Seeking revenge, Toulon, Pinhead, and Jester break into the morgue to get his wife's life essence and inserts it into the woman puppet he made for her, and as she comes to life, he inserts several leeches he found in a jar into her. Later that night, Toulon carries out the first revenge attack on Stein while he fixes Kraus' car, along with Pinhead, Jester and Leech Woman. On his flight from his pursuers, Toulon subsequently finds shelter in a bombed-out building.

Back in his lab, Dr. Hess is studying Toulon's formula, and desperate to meet and talk with him, he goes back to the old theater. Meanwhile, some friends from the puppet show, a boy named Peter Hertz and his father, find André and decide to live with him after Peter's mother was arrested on charges of espionage. The next day, Toulon sends Six-Shooter to kill General Müller, the supervisor of the Nazi reanimation project, while Müller is visiting a brothel. Six-Shooter manages to kill the general, but Müller shoots off one of the puppet's arms beforehand. Peter goes back to Toulon's old atelier to look for a replacement arm and is caught by Dr. Hess, who treats him kindly and gets him to take him to Toulon.

Dr. Hess finds and talks to Toulon, who tells him about the puppets' secret, each of the puppets were a person Toulon knew dearly and they all had a strong will to live after death, that the human spirit is the key to the second life, and the two become friends. But Peter's father betrays Toulon by telling Major Kraus about his hideout in exchange for a pardon for his family. Kraus and his men storm the ruin, but the puppets fight back, enabling Toulon and Hess to escape. Kraus stops Peter and his father, demanding to know where Toulon is; Hertz fights against and is shot by Kraus. While searching the nearby houses, one of Kraus' men is shot by Six-Shooter; but when Hess approaches him, the soldier puts a knife into him before expiring. Hess dies from the injury, telling Toulon to keep fighting. Toulon returns once more to his old theater, where he falls asleep from exhaustion and is soon joined by the now orphaned Peter.

At night, Major Kraus returns to his office, only to fall prey to an ambush by Toulon and his puppets, now joined by Blade, infused with Hess' essence. Toulon takes terrible revenge on Kraus by hanging him from the ceiling by his limbs and neck, which are impaled by sharp hooks. After having a halberd from Kraus' office decorations planted into the floor, point up, Toulon sets the rope on fire; the rope eventually snaps, and Kraus fatally falls right onto the halberd. The film ends with Toulon, posing as Kraus, and Peter leaving the country for Geneva on the express train.

Cast
 Guy Rolfe as André Toulon
 Richard Lynch as Major Kraus
 Ian Abercrombie as Dr. Hess
 Kristopher Logan as Lieutenant Eric Stein
 Aron Eisenberg as Peter Hertz
 Walter Gotell as General Mueller
 Sarah Douglas as Elsa Toulon 
 Matthew Faison as Hertz
 Michelle Bauer as Lili
 Jasmine Touschek as Prostitute
 Eduard Will Soldier On Stage
 John Regis as Morgue Attendant
 Neal Parrow as Young Driver
 Kenneth Cortland as Pharmacy Soldier
 Lenny Rose as Train Station Agent
 Laurie Mateyko as Little Girl
 Rhonda Britten as Mother
 Michael Lowry as Hess Guard #1
 Michael Leroy Rhodes as Hess Guard #2
 John Cann as Young Dead Soldier
 Ivan J. Rado as Cairo Merchant

Featured puppets
 Blade
 Pinhead
 Leech Woman
 Jester
 Tunneler
 Six Shooter
 Djinn the Homunculus (flashback)
 Mephisto (flashback)

Timeline Issue
 Andre’ Toulon escaped Berlin in 1941 in this film. However, Toulon commits suicide on March 15, 1939, in the first installment, and this film mentions the Eastern Front, whose conduct of operations did not take place until summer of 1941. This film could have taken place in that year.

References

External links
 
 

1991 films
Full Moon Features films
Puppet films
Puppet Master (film series)
American supernatural horror films
American action horror films
American World War II films
Films set in 1941
Films set in Berlin
Direct-to-video sequel films
1991 horror films
Direct-to-video prequel films
Films directed by David DeCoteau
American sequel films
Films scored by Richard Band
1990s American films
American prequel films